"I Am a Simple Man" is a song written by Walt Aldridge, and recorded by American country music artist Ricky Van Shelton.  It was released in April 1991 as the first single from his album Backroads.  The song was Ricky Van Shelton's 9th number 1 hit on the Billboard Hot Country Singles & Tracks (now Hot Country Songs) chart.

Content
The narrator's spouse/girlfriend confronts him after a long, tiring day at work, wanting to start an argument by telling him he's hard to understand.

The narrator doesn't want a fight, and responds by telling her he's not hard to understand at all – so long as he has "a job and a piece of land/three squares [three meals] in my frying pan" he's very easy to please.

Chart performance
"I Am a Simple Man" reached number 1 on the Billboard Hot Country Songs chart and on The Canadian RPM Country Tracks chart.

Year-end charts

References

1991 singles
Ricky Van Shelton songs
Music videos directed by Deaton-Flanigen Productions
Songs written by Walt Aldridge
Song recordings produced by Steve Buckingham (record producer)
Columbia Records singles
1990 songs